Manasakshi is a 1954 Indian Malayalam-language film, directed by G. Viswanath and produced by K. S. Akhileswarayyar. The film stars Prem Nazir and Hemalatha in lead roles. The music score is by S. G. K. Pillai. It is the debut Malayalam film of Rajasulochana, singer T. R. Gajalakshmi, and S. G. K. Pillai, as composer.

Cast 
 Prem Nazir as Vijayan
 Hemalatha
 P. Bhaskaran
 Kottarakkara Sreedharan Nair
 Jose Prakash
 Pallom Joseph as Nanu Panicker
 Rajasulochana as Lakshmi Panicker, Nanu Panicker's daughter
 P. A. Thomas as Pachu Panicker, Nanu Panicker's brother and Sarala Panicker's father
 T. R. Omana as Sarala Panicker
 S. P. Pillai as Kuttan Pillai, owner of Kalalayam Arts Troupe

References

External links 
 

1954 films
1950s Malayalam-language films